Patrick Joseph Skerritt (29 May 1926 – 21 November 2001) was an Irish professional golfer.

Skerritt was born in Lahinch, County Clare. He won many tournaments during his career, most of them in his home country, with his biggest success being the 1970 Alcan International. He was also the club professional for over 30 years at St. Anne's Golf Club, situated on Bull Island in Dublin Bay.

Tournament wins

1967 Southern Ireland Championship
1968 Southern Ireland Championship
1970 Southern Ireland Championship, Carroll's Irish Match Play Championship, Alcan International
1973 Kerrygold Championship
1977 Irish PGA Championship
1978 PGA Seniors Championship
1980 PGA Seniors Championship

Results in major championships

Note: Skerritt only played in The Open Championship.

CUT = missed the half-way cut (3rd round cut in 1969 Open Championship)
"T" = tied

Team appearances
R.T.V. International Trophy (representing Ireland): 1967
Double Diamond International (representing Ireland): 1971

References

External links

Irish male golfers
European Tour golfers
European Senior Tour golfers
Sportspeople from County Clare
Sportspeople from County Dublin
People from Lahinch
1926 births
2001 deaths